I-370 may refer to:

 Interstate 370, a highway in Maryland, United States
 Isuzu i-370, a pickup truck
 , an Imperial Japanese Navy submarine commissioned in September 1944 and sunk in February 1945